Vampino, born Elvis Kirya, is a Ugandan dance hall musician and actor debuting his acting career in Nana Kagga's 2012 film, The life. He was one half of the duo "Benon and Vamposs." He is a brother to musician Maurice Kirya. He is signed to Swangz Avenue.

Early life and education
Vampino was born in 1980. He attended Shimoni Primary school, Kabojja and Namasagali secondary before joining Aptech where he attained a diploma in Computer Networking and Maintenance.

Music
Vampino first made his name under a music duo Benon and Vamposs. The duo started doing music in 2000. The duo had successful songs like "Mumulete", "I know", "Nsazewo", and "My lady". The video for their song "Mumuleete" made it to the top ten on MTV chart in UK. In 2009, Vampino opted for a solo career as Benon concentrated on music production. He has had a successful solo career with songs like "Kwekunyakunya" ft Keko (rapper), Juliana Kanyomozi and Cinderella Sanyu and "Tell it" with Radio and Weasle. He has also collaborated with R&B singer Nick Nola on songs like "Nobody Like Me" and "Setula".

Discography
Amabanja, 2014

Benon and Vamposs
Extra, Extra Large, 2007

Filmography
 2012 The Life as Smokey Luciano

References

External links 
"Vamposs In Fresh Claims Over ‘Susan/Akon’ Kid"

1980 births
21st-century Ugandan male singers
Living people
Musicians from Kampala
Kumusha